Khow suey (from ), is a noodle soup made of egg noodles and curried beef or chicken with coconut milk, served with a variety of contrasting condiments.  A squeeze of lemon also adds tanginess to khow suey. The dish is similar to the Burmese noodle dish ohn no khauk swe, literally 'coconut milk noodles'.

History
The dish, known as ohn no khao swè, originated in Burma, and came to the Memon community of Pakistan who adapted this dish, likely coinciding with the emigration of South Asians from Burma in the 1960s, and is now a representative Memon dish now known as khausa.

See also
 Ohn no khao swè
 Laksa
 Khao soi

References

Burmese cuisine
Shan State
Noodle soups